Got a Good Thing Goin' is an album by American organist Big John Patton recorded in 1966 and released on the Blue Note label.

Reception

The AllMusic review by Stephen Thomas Erlewine awarded the album 4½ stars and stated "Fans of hard bop may find the songs a little too simple, but hot, up-tempo soul-jazz rarely comes any better than it does on Got a Good Thing Goin'."

Track listing
All compositions by John Patton and Grant Green except where noted
 "The Yodel" – 8:19
 "Soul Woman" – 7:44
 "Ain't That Peculiar" (Warren "Pete" Moore, Smokey Robinson, Marv Tarplin, Ronald White) – 6:48
 "The Shake" (Sam Cooke) – 7:48
 "Amanda" (Duke Pearson) – 6:08

Personnel
Big John Patton – organ
Grant Green – guitar
Hugh Walker – drums
Richie "Pablo" Landrum – congas

References

Blue Note Records albums
John Patton (musician) albums
1966 albums
Albums recorded at Van Gelder Studio
Albums produced by Alfred Lion